Zarqa is the capital of Zarqa Governorate in Jordan. Its name means "the blue (city)". It had a population of 635,160 inhabitants in 2015, and is the second most populous city in Jordan after Amman.

History

Although the area has been inhabited since the first century CE, the city of Zarqa was only established in 1902, by Chechen immigrants who were displaced due to the wars between the Ottoman and Russian Empires. They settled along the Zarqa River. At that time a station on the Hejaz Railway was built in the new settlement. The railway station turned Zarqa into an important hub. On 10 April 1905, the Ottoman governor issued a decree that allowed the Chechen immigrants to own the land they had settled on. The population then quickly grew in size. On 18 November 1928, the new Jordanian government issued a decree to establish the first municipal council for Zarqa.

After the Transjordan Frontier Force was formed in 1926, military bases were constructed in the city by the British Army, and the city later became known as the "military city". The headquarters of Jordan's Arab Legion were also located in Zarqa.

The oldest Palestinian refugee camp in Jordan, known as Zarqa Camp, is located near the city. It was set up by the International Committee of the Red Cross in 1949, after the exodus of Palestinian refugees from the 1948 Arab-Israeli War. Although the camp initially consisted of tents, UNRWA eventually replaced these tents with concrete shelters. More refugees came to Zarqa after the Gulf War, when the Kuwaiti government expelled a quarter-million Palestinians, whom it suspected of supporting Saddam Hussein. More than half of those expelled went to Zarqa or the nearby city of Russeifa. 

During the Black September conflict in 1970, Popular Front for the Liberation of Palestine members hijacked five airplanes, and forced three to land at Dawson's Field, an airstrip in the desert near Zarqa.

Zarqa is regarded today as a "marginalized" and "conservative" city, with a large Palestinian population. It is a stronghold of political Islamism, and is home to many supporters of the opposition Islamic Action Front party, which is the political wing of the Muslim Brotherhood in Jordan. The city was home to jihadist Abu Musab al-Zarqawi, the first leader of Al-Qaeda in Iraq. About one-third of Jordanians who left to fight in the Syrian Civil War, mainly for Islamist groups, are believed to have come from Zarqa - more than from any other area in the country.

Geography
Zarqa is located in the Zarqa River basin in northeast Jordan.

Climate
Zarqa has a cold semi-arid climate (Köppen climate classification: BSk). Zarqa's elevation is 619 meters above sea level, and the city occasionally receives snowfall in winter.

Demographics

With 700,000 people as of 2010, Zarqa has the third-largest metropolitan population in Jordan after Amman and Irbid. Zarqa city proper is the second-most populous in Jordan after Amman, with a population of about 635,000.

Districts of Greater Zarqa Municipality

Economy and infrastructure

Transportation

From 1908-20, the Hejaz Railway connected Zarqa to Amman, to the south; and to Syria, to the north. A new railway is under construction to re-connect Amman with Zarqa.

Zarqa lies on the international highway that connects Saudi Arabia with Syria, and the international Amman-Baghdad highway also passes through the city.

Industry
Zarqa is Jordan's industrial centre. It is home to over 50% of Jordanian factories.  The growth of industry in the city is the result of low real estate costs and proximity to the capital Amman.

Several facilities that are vital to Jordan's economy are based in Zarqa, such as Jordan's only oil refinery plant. According to the Zarqa Chamber of Commerce, 10% of Jordan's total exports in 2011 came from Zarqa Governorate, amounting to more than US$512 million. Leather and garment products constituted about 52% of Zarqa'a exports, followed by chemical, agricultural and pharmaceutical products.

In September 2020, massive explosions occurred at an army munitions depot for mortars near Zarqa, caused by a short circuit.

Education
There are three universities in Zarqa, the largest of which is Hashemite University. The other two are Al-Balqa` Applied University and Zarqa University.  Other community colleges and research centres are based in Zarqa such as the Al-Zarqa Educational & Investment. The city is also home to many secondary schools (or high schools), most notably the Zarqa Secondary School for Boys, which is considered one of the oldest high schools in Jordan.

Twin towns
 Oran, Algeria.
 Sfax, Tunisia.

Notable people 

 Ahmad Alhendawi, Secretary-General of the World Organization of the Scout Movement
 Saleh Al-Sharabaty, Olympic silver medallist in Taekwondo
 Taghreed Hikmat, judge and Senator, first female judge in Jordan
 Lobo Ismail, singer
 Amjad Nasser, writer, journalist and poet
 Samih al-Qasim, a Palestinian Druze poet
 Ayman Safadi, a Jordanian politician who serves as Deputy Prime Minister and Minister of Foreign Affairs
Abu Musab al-Zarqawi, leader of Al-Qaeda in Iraq

See also

 Railways in Jordan
 Abu Musab al-Zarqawi

References

External links

 Zarka Chamber of Industry
 Zarqa Discussion Forum 
 Photos of Zarqa at the American Center of Research

 
Municipalities in Jordan
Palestinian refugee camps in Jordan
Populated places in Zarqa Governorate